Ronda Jean Rousey (born February 1, 1987) is an American professional wrestler, actress, former judoka, and mixed martial artist. She is currently signed to WWE, where she performs on the SmackDown brand. Prior to joining WWE, she was known for her time in the Ultimate Fighting Championship (UFC). Her long standing nickname, "Rowdy", was inherited from professional wrestler Roddy Piper.

The first American female to earn an Olympic medal in judo by winning bronze at the 2008 Summer Olympics, Rousey began her mixed martial arts (MMA) career with King of the Cage in 2011. She soon joined Strikeforce, becoming their last Women's Bantamweight Champion until its acquisition by UFC. Rousey was part of the company's first ever female fight at UFC 157, was their inaugural Women's Bantamweight Champion, and held the record for most UFC title defenses (6) by a female, until being surpassed by Valentina Shevchenko in 2022.  Rousey retired from MMA in 2016 and was the first female fighter inducted into the UFC Hall of Fame in 2018.

Rousey began a career in professional wrestling in 2018, signing with WWE, and debuted at WrestleMania 34. She won the Raw Women's Championship at that year's SummerSlam, and headlined WWE's inaugural all-women's pay-per-view when she defended her title at WWE Evolution. Rousey lost the title in the first-ever women's WrestleMania main event at WrestleMania 35. Rousey returned at Royal Rumble 2022, winning the women's Royal Rumble match. She later challenged Charlotte Flair for the SmackDown Women's Championship at WrestleMania 38 in a losing effort. At WrestleMania Backlash the following month, Rousey defeated Flair in an "I Quit" match to win the SmackDown Women's Championship. She  later lost the title to Liv Morgan due to a Money in the Bank cash-in, and regained the title at Extreme Rules to make her a two-time SmackDown Women's Champion, and overall three-time Women's World Champion in WWE.

Rousey is the only woman to be the champion in both the UFC and WWE, as well as the only woman to headline a pay-per-view event in both companies. She was voted the best female athlete of all time in a 2015 ESPN fan poll, and Fox Sports described her as "one of the defining athletes of the 21st century." Rousey has also appeared in films, including The Expendables 3 (2014), Furious 7 (2015), and Mile 22 (2018), and relegraphy My Fight / Your Fight in 2015.

Early life
Ronda Jean Rousey was born in Riverside, California on February 1, 1987, the youngest of three daughters of AnnMaria De Mars (née Waddell) and Ronald John Rousey, after whom she was named. Her mother, a decorated judoka, was the first American to win a World Judo Championship (in 1984). Rousey is of English, Polish, and, through her maternal grandfather, Trinidadian and Venezuelan ancestry. One of her maternal great-grandfathers, Alfred E. Waddell, was a Trinidadian doctor who emigrated to Canada and became one of the first Black physicians in North America, while a maternal great-grandmother was born in Caracas, Venezuela. Her stepfather is an aerospace engineer. When Rousey was eight years old, her biological father, who had broken his back while sledding with his kids, committed suicide. AnnMaria pursued a PhD in educational psychology at the University of California, Riverside as her daughters grew up.

For the first six years of her life, Rousey struggled with speech and could not form an intelligible sentence due to apraxia, a neurological childhood speech sound disorder. This speech disorder was attributed to being born with her umbilical cord wrapped around her neck. When Rousey was three years old, her mother and father moved from Riverside, California, to Jamestown, North Dakota, to obtain intensive speech therapy with specialists at Minot State University. Rousey dropped out of high school and later earned her GED. She was raised between Jamestown and Southern California, retiring from her judo career at 21 and starting her MMA career at 22 when she realized that she did not want to spend her life in a conventional field of work.

Olympic judo career
Rousey began judo with her mother at the age of 11. Rousey trained with her mother until she was 13, when she accidentally broke her mother's wrist. At 17, Rousey was the youngest judoka to qualify for the 2004 Olympic Games in Athens. Rousey lost in her first match to silver medalist Claudia Heill in the 63 kg bracket. Also that year, Rousey won a gold medal at the 2004 World Judo Juniors Championships in Budapest, Hungary.

In April 2006, she became the first female U.S. judoka in nearly 10 years to win an A-Level tournament as she went 5–0 to claim gold at the Birmingham World Cup in Great Britain. Later that year, the 19-year-old won the bronze medal at the 2006 Junior World Championships, becoming the first U.S. athlete to win two Junior World medals.

In February 2007, Rousey moved up to 70 kg where she ranked as one of the top three women in the world. She won the gold medal at the 2007 Pan American Games and the silver medal at the 2007 World Judo Championships.

In August 2008, Rousey competed at the 2008 Olympic Games in Beijing, China. She lost her quarterfinal to the Dutch ex-world champion Edith Bosch but qualified for a bronze medal match through the repechage bracket. Rousey defeated Annett Boehm by Yuko to win a bronze medal (Judo offers two bronze medals per weight class). With the victory, Rousey became the first American to win an Olympic medal in women's judo since its inception as an Olympic sport in 1992.

Rousey retired from judo at 21 after the Olympics. After winning her Olympic medal, Rousey shared a studio apartment with a roommate in Venice Beach, California and worked three jobs as a bartender and cocktail waitress to support herself and her dog.

Mixed martial arts career

Training
When Rousey started learning judo, her mother took her to judo clubs run by her old teammates. Rousey went to Hayastan MMA Academy, which was run by Gokor Chivichyan, where she trained with fellow future MMA fighters Manny Gamburyan and Karo Parisyan. According to Rousey, Hayastan practiced "a more brawling style of judo versus the more technical Japanese style." Rousey trained mostly with males bigger than she was and often got frustrated and cried when she got thrown and could not throw somebody. "Probably from 2002 to 2005 I cried every single night of training," Rousey remarked.

Rousey trained closely with Gamburyan. After Rousey injured her knee when she was 16, Gamburyan volunteered to open the gym every afternoon and work with her personally. Back in 2004, her teammates thought Rousey "would kill these girls" in MMA, but also thought she was "too pretty to get hit in the face" and should keep doing judo. While Gamburyan and Parisyan went into MMA, Rousey stuck with judo but remained in touch with MMA through them. The first MMA fight she took an interest in watching was Manny Gamburyan versus Nate Diaz in The Ultimate Fighter finale. Rousey stated she never got as excited watching judo or any other sport. After the 2008 Olympics the following year, she decided to start MMA through Team Hayastan.

Rousey also trained at the Glendale Fighting Club, to which she was introduced by Gamburyan and other Hayastan teammates. She started training under her long-term MMA coach Edmond Tarverdyan at GFC.

She trained in Jiu Jitsu at Dynamix MMA with Henry Akins from 2011 to 2014 and went on to train with Ryron Gracie and Rener Gracie of Gracie Academy, as well as BJ Penn of Art of Jiu-Jitsu. In wrestling, Rousey trained under the Romanian American Leo Frîncu.

Early career (2010–2011)
Rousey made her mixed martial arts debut as an amateur on August 6, 2010. She defeated Hayden Munoz by submission due to an armbar in 23 seconds.

She entered the quarterfinals of the Tuff-N-Uff 145 lbs women's tournament on November 12, 2010, and submitted promotional veteran Autumn Richardson with an armbar in 57 seconds.

Rousey faced Taylor Stratford in the Tuff-N-Uff tournament semi-finals on January 7, 2011, and won by technical submission due to an armbar in 24 seconds. She then announced plans to turn pro and was replaced in the tournament. Rousey has a 3–0 record in amateur MMA competition, and the combined duration of all her amateur fights is under 2 minutes.

Rousey made her professional mixed martial arts debut on March 27, 2011, at King of the Cage: Turning Point. She submitted Ediane Gomes with an armbar in 25 seconds.

Rousey faced kickboxing champion Charmaine Tweet in an MMA bout at Hard Knocks Fighting Championship: School of Hard Knocks 12 on June 17, 2011, in Calgary, Canada. She submitted Tweet with an armbar in 49 seconds.

Strikeforce (2011–2012)

Early success
Rousey was scheduled to make her Strikeforce debut against Sarah D'Alelio on July 30, 2011, at Strikeforce: Fedor vs. Henderson in Hoffman Estates, Illinois. The fight was postponed and eventually took place on the Strikeforce Challengers 18 main card on August 12, 2011, in Las Vegas, Nevada. Rousey defeated D'Alelio by technical submission due to an armbar early in the first round. The victory was controversial. Rousey claimed that D'Alelio yelled "tap" more than once and that D'Alelio denied this and claimed to have yelled "Aaaahhh". According to the unified rules of mixed martial arts, either one of these utterances would still be a verbal submission.

Rousey faced Julia Budd at Strikeforce Challengers 20 on November 18, 2011, in Las Vegas. She won via submission due to an armbar in the first round, dislocating Budd's elbow in the process. Following the fight, she announced plans to move down to 135 pounds to challenge Miesha Tate, the Strikeforce Women's Bantamweight Champion at the time, with whom she had developed a much-publicized rivalry.

During his appearance on The Joe Rogan Experience, Rousey's trainer Edmond Tarverdyan said that Rousey started her MMA career in the 145 lb division because she had to be able to make weight at short notice, due to the difficulty of finding willing opponents.

Women's Bantamweight Champion
Rousey challenged Tate for her Strikeforce title on March 3, 2012, in Columbus, Ohio. She defeated Tate by submission due to an armbar in the first round, again dislocating her opponent's elbow, to become the new Strikeforce Women's Bantamweight Champion.

Rousey appeared in All Access: Ronda Rousey on Showtime. The half-hour special debuted on August 8, 2012. UFC President Dana White revealed during the program that "In the next 10 years, if there's a woman in the octagon, it's probably going to be Ronda Rousey." The second installment of the special aired on August 15, 2012. Rousey also appeared on Conan.

Rousey defended her strikeforce title against Sarah Kaufman at Strikeforce: Rousey vs. Kaufman on August 18, 2012, in San Diego, California. Rousey said that she would throw Kaufman's arm at her corner after ripping it off with an armbar, and threatened to choke or pound Kaufman's face to death. During the fight, Rousey quickly took Kaufman down and submitted her with an armbar in 54 seconds to retain the Strikeforce Women's Bantamweight Championship. After the fight, Rousey announced that if former Strikeforce Women's Featherweight Champion Cris Cyborg wanted to fight her, it would have to take place at bantamweight.

Ultimate Fighting Championship (2012–2016)

First female UFC Champion

In November 2012, the Ultimate Fighting Championship announced that Rousey had become the first female fighter to sign with the UFC. UFC President Dana White officially announced at the UFC on Fox: Henderson vs. Diaz pre-fight press conference that Rousey was the first UFC Women's Bantamweight Champion.

Rousey originally opposed using the nickname her friends gave her, "Rowdy", feeling it would be disrespectful to professional wrestler "Rowdy" Roddy Piper. After meeting Piper (circa 2012 or 2013) through Gene LeBell, who helped train both of them, Piper personally gave his approval.

Rousey defended her title against Liz Carmouche on February 23, 2013, at UFC 157. Despite being caught in an early standing neck crank attempt from Carmouche, Rousey went on to successfully defend her Bantamweight Championship title, winning the fight at 4:49 into the first round by submission due to an armbar. Carmouche dislocated Ronda Rousey's jaw during the fight.

After Cat Zingano defeated Miesha Tate at The Ultimate Fighter: Team Jones vs. Team Sonnen Finale, Dana White announced that Zingano would be a coach of The Ultimate Fighter 18 against Rousey. On May 28, Zingano having suffered a knee injury, it was announced Miesha Tate would coach The Ultimate Fighter 18 against Rousey.

Rousey faced Miesha Tate, in a rematch from Strikeforce, at UFC 168 on December 28, 2013. After going past the first two rounds, with Tate surviving an armbar attempt and a triangle attempt, Rousey finally submitted Tate via armbar in the third round to retain her Bantamweight Championship. In an interview with Los Angeles Daily News, Rousey said she had lost muscle during her film commitments and not been able to regain her full strength for the Tate fight.

Record-setting championship reign
It was announced at the UFC 168 post-fight press conference that Rousey would defend the UFC Women's Bantamweight Championship against fellow Olympic medalist and undefeated fighter Sara McMann in the main event at UFC 170 on February 22, 2014. Rousey won the fight by TKO after knocking down McMann with a knee to the body just over a minute into the first round. This marked Rousey's first career win via a method other than armbar. The stoppage led to controversy, with some sports writers and attendants finding it premature.

In 2014, Rousey was named one of espnW's Impact 25.

On April 11, 2014, it was announced that Rousey would defend the UFC Women's Bantamweight Championship against Alexis Davis in the co-main event at UFC 175 on July 5, 2014. She won the fight via knockout 16 seconds into the first round. Rousey broke her thumb during the fight. The emphatic win also earned Rousey her second Performance of the Night bonus award.

A match between Rousey and Cat Zingano was scheduled to take place at UFC 182 for the women's bantamweight title. However, the fight was moved to February 28, 2015, at UFC 184. Rousey defeated Zingano with an armbar in 14 seconds, the shortest match in UFC championship history until Conor McGregor defeated José Aldo in 13 seconds 11 months later.

Rousey fought Bethe Correia on August 1, 2015, in Brazil, at UFC 190, winning the bout by knockout 34 seconds into the first round. Rousey dedicated the match to "Rowdy" Roddy Piper, who died the day before, commenting that Piper was one of her inspirations and had endorsed her use of his nickname.

The bout was Rousey's sixth with the UFC, all of which had been victories. She spent 1077 seconds in the octagon to attain all six and accumulated $1,080,000 in prize money; this equated to nearly $1002.79 for every second spent fighting. Her average time of 2 minutes and 59 seconds was less than the average time of a single match in every UFC weight class, the fastest of which was the Heavyweight division with a time of 7 minutes and 59 seconds.

Title loss and subsequent retirement
In her seventh title defense, Rousey faced Holly Holm in the main event at UFC 193 on November 15, 2015. Despite being a heavy betting favorite, Rousey was out struck by Holm for most of the bout, and was knocked out with a head kick in round two, losing her title and undefeated streak in the process. After the fight, Rousey and Holm were each awarded a Fight of the Night bonus of $50,000. She was also medically suspended by UFC on November 18, 2015. She was medically cleared on December 9, 2015. The loss to Holm impacted Rousey significantly. Upon her return to the United States after the fight, she hid her face from the paparazzi with a purple pillow. In a February 16, 2016, appearance on The Ellen DeGeneres Show, Rousey stated that she considered suicide in the immediate aftermath of her head kick KO defeat to Holm.

After over a year away from the sport, Rousey returned to face champion Amanda Nunes on December 30, 2016, in the main event at UFC 207. Rousey lost the fight via TKO early in round one.

Although she did not formally announce her retirement, when asked if she would fight MMA again by Ellen DeGeneres in 2018, Rousey replied, "I think it's just as likely as me going back to another Olympics for judo." She was inducted into the UFC Hall of Fame in July 2018.

Mixed martial arts fighting style

In a 2012 interview before her first match with Miesha Tate, Rousey said: "When I was doing judo my main advantage was my conditioning and my pace; I used to wear people out." She had taken to heart a quote from Ryoko Tani to fight every five seconds as if it was the last five seconds of the match.

A decorated judoka, Rousey typically grounds an opponent with hip throws and sweeps, then seeks to finish with strikes or submissions. From top position, she usually attacks with punches from side control; in rear position, she often secures a back mount and attacks with head strikes. Rousey is right-handed, but is a left-handed judoka fighting in an orthodox stance as a striker.

Rousey's favorite MMA fighter is Fedor Emelianenko, whose fighting style she works to emulate.

Rousey is well known for her skill in grappling and is particularly noted for her string of victories by armbar. Against accomplished strikers, such as Julia Budd and Sarah Kaufman, Rousey has typically brought the fight down and sought a quick submission. Only powerful grapplers, such as Miesha Tate and Liz Carmouche, have been competitive with Rousey on the ground.

During early fights in her MMA career, Rousey mainly used striking to set up judo. She became a more proficient striker following her UFC debut, leading to her first wins by way of stoppage. While standing, Rousey normally uses jabs, knees, and overhand rights. She seldom stood side on with a set boxing stance, but would square up to the opponent, while still generating strong striking power, especially when near the fence, or clinching opponents with the left hand to close the distance.

While discussing her signature armbar in an interview, Rousey noted that her judoka mother jumped on her every morning to wake her up with armbars.

Rousey is notable for introducing trash talking to women's MMA. In many interviews Rousey has used harsh language and openly downplayed the abilities of her opponents, which she explains as a way to generate more publicity for the sport.

Professional wrestling career

Background
Rousey is a professional wrestling fan. She, Shayna Baszler, Jessamyn Duke and Marina Shafir have dubbed themselves "The Four Horsewomen," a play on The Four Horsemen professional wrestling stable, with the blessing of members Ric Flair and Arn Anderson.

WWE

Sporadic appearances and signing (2014–2017)

The Four Horsewomen were acknowledged on camera and commentary as such, in the front row at WWE's SummerSlam event on August 17, 2014. The group also went backstage during the event, meeting Paul Heyman, among others. Rousey was interviewed by WWE.com that night; when asked if she, like Brock Lesnar, would cross over to wrestling, she replied: "You never know."

At WrestleMania 31 on March 29, 2015, the Four Horsewomen were seated in the front row. During an in-ring argument between The Rock and The Authority (Stephanie McMahon and Triple H), McMahon slapped the Rock and ordered him to leave "her ring". She taunted him, saying he would not hit a woman. He left, paused and walked over to Rousey to a loud ovation. He then helped her into the ring and said that she would be happy to hit McMahon for him. After a staredown, The Rock attacked Triple H. When he stumbled toward Rousey, she tossed him out of the ring. McMahon tried to slap her, was blocked and Rousey grabbed her arm, teasing an armbar, before throwing her out of the ring. Rousey and the Rock celebrated in the ring, while the Authority retreated with the implication of revenge. The segment was replayed and discussed throughout the next night's Raw with the commentators hyping a tweet Rousey made earlier that day, in which she implied a return to WWE with "We're just gettin' started...".

On July 13, 14, and September 12, 2017, the Horsewomen appeared in the audience of the Mae Young Classic to support their compatriot Shayna Baszler, who was making her WWE debut in the tournament. Additionally, during the event, all four Horsewomen had a face-off with Charlotte Flair, Becky Lynch, and Bayley, who, in WWE together with Sasha Banks, are also known as the Four Horsewomen, hinting at a possible future feud between the two groups.

It was reported in 2017 that Rousey had signed with the WWE on a full-time basis and had been training at the WWE Performance Center in Orlando. She also trained under Brian Kendrick at his wrestling school.

Raw Women's Champion (2018–2019)

Rousey made a surprise appearance at Royal Rumble on January 28, 2018, confronting Raw Women's Champion Alexa Bliss, SmackDown Women's Champion Charlotte Flair, and Asuka, who had just won the inaugural women's Royal Rumble match. ESPN immediately revealed during the segment that she had signed a full–time contract with WWE. The jacket which Rousey wore during this appearance belonged to "Rowdy" Roddy Piper, given to her by his son. On February 25 at the Elimination Chamber pay–per–view, Rousey was involved in an in–ring altercation with Triple H and Stephanie McMahon, after which she signed her contract (in storyline), thus making her a part of the Raw brand.

On the March 5 episode of Raw, it was announced that Rousey would make her in–ring debut at WrestleMania 34, WWE's flagship event, in a mixed tag team match pitting Rousey and Kurt Angle as her partner against Stephanie McMahon and Triple H. At WrestleMania on April 8, Rousey submitted McMahon with her trademark armbar submission hold to secure the win for her team. Her debut performance was widely praised by both fans and wrestling critics, with Jim Cornette calling it the greatest debut ever while Dave Meltzer of the Wrestling Observer noting that she "at no point looked out of her element, she was crisp in just about everything", calling her performance "one of the better pro wrestling debuts I've ever seen". The Washington Post noted the positive fan reaction, stating "The match exceeded expectations, with fans firmly behind Rousey" and "[fans were] surprised [at her] high–level coordination and quality of wrestling. Even those who were not agreed the match was entertaining."

In May, she was challenged by then-champion Nia Jax, and it was announced that Rousey would get her first opportunity at the Raw Women's Championship at the Money in the Bank pay–per–view. At the event on June 17, Rousey won the match by disqualification after interference by Alexa Bliss, who attacked both Rousey and Jax and cashed in her Money in the Bank contract (which she won earlier that night) to win the title instead. For her first singles match and title opportunity, she was once again praised by fans and critics for her performance, with CNET stating "For the first time, [WWE's] biggest mainstream star is a woman." They believed that despite "worry was that the match would expose Rousey's own inexperience, which would greatly damage her aura and star power", she "came across as a formidable, believable star wrestler. The match was good, but she was awesome". Throughout the next two months, Rousey would start her first feud as part of WWE with Alexa Bliss over the title, which included a suspension (again in kayfabe) after Rousey attacked Bliss, Kurt Angle, and multiple officials. After honouring her suspension from in–ring competition, Rousey received a Raw Women's Championship match by Raw general manager Kurt Angle against Bliss at SummerSlam. At the event on August 19, Rousey squashed Bliss to win the title, her first championship win in WWE. In a rematch between the two that took place a month later on September 16 at Hell in a Cell, Rousey once again submitted Bliss to retain the title.

Throughout her championship reign, Rousey went on to fend off title contenders such as Nikki Bella (in the main event of the first all women's pay–per–view Evolution on October 28), Mickie James, Nia Jax, Natalya, and Sasha Banks. Rousey was supposed to face Becky Lynch at the Survivor Series pay–per–view in an interbrand champion vs. champion match, however, Lynch was legitimately injured during an invasion angle just minutes after she attacked Rousey backstage. At the event on November 18, Rousey faced Charlotte Flair instead, and won via disqualification after Flair attacked her with a kendo stick and steel chairs. A month later, at TLC: Tables, Ladders & Chairs on December 16, Rousey gained revenge against both Flair and Lynch as she pushed them off a ladder during their match, also helping Asuka win the SmackDown Women's Championship. Shortly after she retained her title against Bayley, on the January 28, 2019, episode of Raw, Rousey continued her feud with Becky Lynch (who had won the Royal Rumble match) after the latter chose to challenge her in a title match at WrestleMania 35. On the February 11 episode of Raw, Vince McMahon suspended Lynch for 60 days in storyline and announced Charlotte Flair replaced Lynch as Rousey's WrestleMania opponent. On the March 4 episode of Raw, Rousey turned heel for the first time in her career when she attacked both Flair and Lynch. At Fastlane on March 10, Lynch faced Flair in a match where if Lynch won, she would be inserted back into the Raw Women's Championship match at WrestleMania. Rousey attacked Lynch during the match, giving Lynch the disqualification victory and thus the WrestleMania triple threat match between Rousey, Flair and Lynch was made official. On March 25, WWE announced Rousey's title defense against Lynch and Flair would be the main event of WrestleMania 35, making it the first women's match to close WrestleMania. At the event on April 7, in what was changed to a Winner takes all for Rousey's Raw and Flair's SmackDown Women's Championships, Lynch controversially pinned Rousey to win both titles. The commentary and production team commented that Rousey was in the ring saying her shoulders were not down for the full three-count and showed a replay of the ending pin-pointing this fact. Nonetheless, this gave Rousey her first loss in WWE and ended her championship reign at 231 days; it would remain the longest reign as Raw Women's Champion until Lynch's own would surpass Rousey's.

SmackDown Women's Champion (2022–2023)
On January 29, 2022, at the Royal Rumble, Rousey returned to WWE as a face, entering at #28 in the Women's Royal Rumble match and eliminating Brie Bella, Nikki A.S.H, and Shotzi. She won by last eliminating Charlotte Flair, thus earning a championship match at WrestleMania 38. On the February 4 episode of SmackDown (her first appearance on the brand), Rousey chose to challenge Flair for the SmackDown Women's Championship at WrestleMania. At Elimination Chamber on February 19, Rousey and Naomi defeated Flair and Sonya Deville. Rousey's rift with Flair continued over the next few weeks, and in the first night of WrestleMania 38 on April 2, Flair defeated Rousey to retain the title, ending Rousey's undefeated singles streak and giving Rousey her second loss. On the following SmackDown, Rousey challenged Flair to an "I Quit" match, which she declined. However, the match was subsequently granted and scheduled for WrestleMania Backlash on May 8, where Rousey defeated Flair to win the title.

On the May 13 episode of SmackDown, she retained her title against Raquel Rodriguez in an open challenge. At Money in the Bank on July 2, Rousey retained her title against Natalya, but after the match, Liv Morgan successfully cashed in her Money in the Bank contract on Rousey, ending her reign at 55 days. On the following episode of SmackDown, it was announced that Rousey would challenge Morgan for the title at SummerSlam. At the event on July 30, Rousey lost to Morgan in controversial fashion, with Morgan winning by pinfall despite submitting to Rousey's armbar while her shoulders were down. After the match, Rousey attacked Morgan and the referee, turning heel for the first time since 2019. As a result of attacking the referee, Rousey was (kayfabe) suspended from WWE. After her suspension was lifted, Rousey won a fatal five-way elimination match on the September 9 episode of SmackDown to earn a rematch against Morgan for the SmackDown Women's Championship at Extreme Rules. The following week, Morgan challenged Rousey to an Extreme Rules match for the title, which Rousey accepted. At the event on October 8, Rousey defeated Morgan to win her second SmackDown Women's Championship.

On the October 28 episode of SmackDown, Rousey retained her title against the returning Emma in an open challenge. At Survivor Series WarGames on November 26, Rousey retained her title against Shotzi with help from Shayna Baszler. On the December 30 episode of SmackDown, Rousey retained her title against Raquel Rodriguez. After the match, Rousey was confronted by the returning Charlotte Flair, who challenged Rousey to an impromptu title match, which she accepted. However, Rousey was defeated by Flair in under a minute, ending her second reign at 83 days.

Partnership with Shayna Baszler (2023-present)
After a brief hiatus, Rousey returned on the February 10 episode of Raw to help Baszler attack Liv Morgan and Tegan Nox, officially beginning an alliance between the two.

Other ventures
Rousey appeared nude on the cover of ESPN The Magazines 2012 Body Issue and in a pictorial therein. 
In May 2013, Rousey was ranked 29 on the Maxim Hot 100. She also appeared on the cover and in a pictorial of the September 2013 issue.
 
 
Rousey co-starred in The Expendables 3 (2014), marking her first role in a major motion picture. In 2015, she appeared in the film Furious 7, and played herself in the film Entourage.

In 2015, Rousey became the first woman featured on the cover of Australian Men's Fitness, appearing on their November edition.

In October 2015, Rousey became the first female athlete to guest host ESPN's SportsCenter.

Rousey was on the cover of the January 2016 issue for The Ring magazine. She became the first mixed martial artist to ever appear on the cover of the boxing magazine and the second woman as well, after Cathy Davis in 1978. In February 2016 she appeared in body paint as one of three cover athletes on the cover of the Sports Illustrated Swimsuit Issue.

Rousey hosted the January 23, 2016, episode of the late-night variety show Saturday Night Live, with musical guest Selena Gomez.

Rousey appeared in the Season 2, Episode 20 episode of Blindspot playing the role of Devon Penberthy, a prison inmate serving time for transporting weapons across state lines.

A number of starring film roles have been developed for Rousey, including an adaptation of her autobiography My Fight / Your Fight at Paramount, The Athena Project at Warner Bros., the Peter Berg-directed action film Mile 22. Rousey was scheduled to star in a remake of the 1989 Patrick Swayze action drama Road House. Road House would have marked her biggest acting job to date. According to Variety, Rousey reached out to Swayze's widow, Lisa Niemi, to ask for her blessing, which Niemi gave. However, the Road House project was cancelled in 2016.

On July 9, 2018, Rousey was confirmed as one of the two pre-order bonus characters for the video game WWE 2K19 (the other being wrestling veteran Rey Mysterio). She previously appeared in EA Sports UFC, EA Sports UFC 2 and EA Sports UFC 3. She later appeared in WWE 2K20, WWE 2K Battlegrounds , WWE 2K22 as a downloadable character and WWE 2K23. Rousey has also appeared in the EA Sports UFC, WWE SuperCard, WWE Champions and WWE Mayhem mobile games as a playable character.

On January 17, 2019, it was confirmed that Rousey would be voicing Sonya Blade in the video game Mortal Kombat 11.

On August 18, 2019, it was revealed that Rousey is appearing as a recurring character Lena Bosko in the third season of FOX's 9-1-1 series. During her first day of shooting, she injured two fingers after her left hand was jammed in a boat door. The tip of her ring finger was fractured while her middle finger was broken with the tendon nearly severed. Rousey was rushed to the hospital, where her middle finger was mended with a metal plate and screws.

On February 18, 2020, Rousey announced her first stream on Facebook Gaming and donated all stream profits to charity.

In January 2022, Rousey was among the top 20 richest MMA fighters with US$12 million net worth. She was the only woman in the top 20.

On November 30, 2022, Rousey was added as a playable character to the game Raid Shadow Legends.

Personal life

As of 2017, Rousey lives in Venice, California.

Rousey became a vegan after Beijing 2008, but in 2012 described her diet as "kind of a mix between a Paleo and a Warrior diet", trying to eat everything.

Rousey has discussed how she struggled with her body image in the past. She explained; 

Rousey is an avid fan of Dragon Ball Z and Pokémon.  Her favorite Pokémon is Mew. As a child, she wanted to be Android 18 and developed a crush on Vegeta. Christopher Sabat, the English voice actor of Vegeta, jokingly replied in an interview, "She has seen my power level for what it is… She also scares me." She also plays World of Warcraft, primarily as a night elf hunter.

On 30th November 2022, Ronda received her own Legendary Champion on Plarium's Raid Shadow Legends RPG game named after her.

In 2015, she raised money by auctioning signed T-shirts for the Black Jaguar-White Tiger Foundation, whose goal is to save big cats from circuses and zoos and provide them with the best lifestyle.

In April 2015, Rousey visited Yerevan, Armenia for the 100th anniversary of the Armenian genocide. While in Yerevan, she visited the Tsitsernakaberd Armenian Genocide memorial.

Rousey endorsed Bernie Sanders' presidential campaign in the 2016 United States presidential election.

In February 2016, in an interview with Ellen DeGeneres Rousey admitted that suicidal thoughts went through her mind in the aftermath of her knockout loss to Holly Holm in November 2015.

Relationships
Rousey once dated fellow UFC fighter Brendan Schaub. In August 2015, Rousey was rumored to be in a relationship with UFC fighter Travis Browne, who knocked out Schaub in a bout the previous year, after a picture of the two together appeared on Twitter and Browne's estranged wife Jenna Renee Webb accused the two of seeing one another. Browne was at the time still married and under investigation by the UFC after Webb publicly accused him of domestic violence in July 2015. Browne confirmed he and Rousey were together in October 2015. The next day, Rousey revealed that she was dating Browne.
Rousey and Browne got engaged on April 20, 2017, in New Zealand and married on August 28, 2017, in Browne's home state of Hawaii. On April 21, 2021, Rousey announced on her official YouTube channel that she was four months pregnant with her first child. On September 27, 2021, Rousey gave birth to a girl named La’akea Makalapuaokalanipō Browne.

In her autobiography, My Fight, Your Fight, Rousey wrote of an incident with a former boyfriend she dubbed "Snappers McCreepy" after she discovered that he had taken nude photos of her without her consent or knowledge, two weeks before her first fight with Miesha Tate. When a seething Rousey met him, she "slapped him across the face so hard [her] hand hurt." According to Rousey, he then refused to let her leave as he was trying to explain, so she attacked his face with two punches, one more slap, one knee, then "tossed him aside on the kitchen floor." She went to her car and he followed, grabbing the steering wheel, so she "dragged him out onto the sidewalk, and left him writhing there". Rousey deleted the photos and erased his hard drive; however, fear that the pictures may still be out there influenced her to pose for ESPN magazine's Body Issue so that nude pictures of her would be seen on her own terms. Rousey faced some criticism because she had committed domestic abuse.

Filmography

Film

Television

Championships and accomplishments

Judo
 International Judo Federation
 2008 World Cup Senior Gold Medalist
 2008 Belgian Ladies Open Senior Bronze Medalist
 2007 Jigoro Kano Cup Senior Silver Medalist
 2007 Finnish Open Senior Gold Medalist
 2007 World Judo Championships Senior Silver Medalist
 2007 German Open Senior Bronze Medalist
 2007 Pan American Games Senior Gold Medalist
 2007 Pan American Championships Senior Bronze Medalist
 2007 World Cup Senior Gold Medalist
 2007 British Open Senior Gold Medalist
 2006 Finnish Open Senior Bronze Medalist
 2006 Swedish Open Senior Gold Medalist
 2006 World Judo Championships Junior Bronze Medalist
 2006 Rendez-Vous Senior Gold Medalist
 2006 Pan American Championships Senior Silver Medalist
 2006 World Cup Senior Gold Medalist
 2006 Belgian Ladies Open Senior Gold Medalist
 2005 Ontario Open Senior Gold Medalist
 2005 Rendez-Vous Senior Gold Medalist
 2005 Pan American Championships Senior Gold Medalist
 2004 Ontario Open Senior Gold Medalist
 2004 Ontario Open Junior Gold Medalist
 2004 World Judo Championships Junior Gold Medalist
 2004 Rendez-Vous Senior Bronze Medalist
 2004 Pan American Championships Senior Gold Medalist
 2003 Rendez-Vous Senior Gold Medalist
 2001 Coupe Canada Senior Cup Gold Medalist
 Summer Olympic Games
 2008 Summer Olympics Senior Bronze Medalist
 USA Judo
 USA Senior National Championship (2004, 2005, 2006, 2007, 2008, 2010)
 USA Senior Olympic Team Trials Winner (2004, 2008)
 2007 US Open Senior Gold Medalist
 2006 US Open Senior Gold Medalist
 2006 USA Fall Classic Senior Gold Medalist
 2006 US Open Junior Gold Medalist
 2005 US Open Senior Gold Medalist
 2005 US Open Junior Silver Medalist
 2004 US Open Senior Bronze Medalist
 2003 US Open Senior Silver Medalist
 2003 USA Fall Classic Senior Gold Medalist
 2002 US Open Junior Gold Medalist

Other accomplishments
International Sports Hall of Fame (Class of 2018)

Mixed martial arts
 Ultimate Fighting Championship
UFC Hall of Fame (first female inductee)
 UFC Women's Bantamweight Championship (one-time, inaugural)
 Six successful title defenses
 Fight of the Night (two times) vs. Miesha Tate and Holly Holm
 Submission of the Night (one time) vs. Miesha Tate
 Performance of the Night (four times) vs. Cat Zingano,  Sara McMann,  Alexis Davis, and Bethe Correia
 First female UFC Champion
 First Olympic medalist to win a UFC championship
 Fastest women's title fight victory in UFC history (fourteen seconds; vs Cat Zingano)
 Longest title fight finish streak in UFC history (6)
 Most armbar finishes in UFC/WEC/Pride/Strikeforce history (9)
 Most consecutive armbar finishes in UFC/WEC/Pride/Strikeforce history (8)
Second-most title defenses by a woman in UFC history (six)
 Won the first ever women's fight in UFC history
 Strikeforce
 Strikeforce Women's Bantamweight Championship (one time; last)
 One successful title defense
 2x Female Submission of the Year (2011, 2012)
 ESPN
 2x Best Female Athlete ESPY Award (2014, 2015)
 Best Fighter ESPY Award (2015)
 First Mixed Martial Artist to win an ESPY Award
 Submission of the Year (2012, vs. Miesha Tate on March 3)
 MMAJunkie.com
 2015 February Submission of the Month vs. Cat Zingano
 2015 August Knockout of the Month vs. Bethe Correia
 World MMA Awards
 3x Female Fighter of the Year (2012, 2013, 2014)
 2015 Submission of the Year vs. Cat Zingano at UFC 184
 Wrestling Observer Newsletter awards
 2x Best Box Office Draw (2014, 2015)
 2x Mixed Martial Arts Most Valuable (2014, 2015)
 Most Outstanding Fighter of the Year (2014)

Professional wrestling
CBS Sports
Rookie of the Year (2018)
Pro Wrestling Illustrated
Ranked No. 1 of the top 100 female singles wrestlers in the PWI Female 100 in 2018
Rookie of the Year (2018)
Sports Illustrated
Ranked No. 4 of the top 10 women's wrestlers in 2018
 Wrestling Observer Newsletter awards
 Rookie of the Year (2018)
 Most Overrated (2022)
 WWE
 WWE SmackDown Women's Championship (2 times)
 WWE Raw Women's Championship (1 time)
 Women's Royal Rumble (2022)
 Slammy Award (1 time)
 for "This is Awesome" Moment of the Year (2015) – 
 WWE Year-End Award
 Best Diss of the Year (2018)

Mixed martial arts record

|-
| Loss
| align=center|12–2
| Amanda Nunes
| TKO (punches)
| UFC 207
| 
| align=center|1
| align=center|0:48
| Las Vegas, Nevada, United States
| 
|-
| Loss
| align=center| 12–1
| Holly Holm
| KO (head kick and punches)
| UFC 193
| 
| align=center|2
| align=center|0:59
| Melbourne, Australia
| 
|-
| Win
| align=center| 12–0
| Bethe Correia
| KO (punch)
| UFC 190
| 
| align=center| 1
| align=center| 0:34
| Rio de Janeiro, Brazil
| 
|-
| Win
| align=center| 11–0
| Cat Zingano
| Submission (straight armbar)
| UFC 184
| 
| align=center| 1
| align=center| 0:14
| Los Angeles, California, United States
| 
|-
| Win
| align=center| 10–0
| Alexis Davis
| KO (punches)
| UFC 175
| 
| align=center| 1
| align=center| 0:16
| Las Vegas, Nevada, United States
| 
|-
| Win
| align=center| 9–0
| Sara McMann
| TKO (knee to the body)
| UFC 170
| 
| align=center| 1
| align=center| 1:06
| Las Vegas, Nevada, United States
| 
|-
| Win
| align=center| 8–0
| Miesha Tate
| Submission (armbar)
| UFC 168
| 
| align=center| 3
| align=center| 0:58
| Las Vegas, Nevada, United States
| 
|-
| Win
| align=center| 7–0
| Liz Carmouche
| Submission (armbar)
| UFC 157
| 
| align=center| 1
| align=center| 4:49
| Anaheim, California, United States
| 
|-
| Win
| align=center| 6–0
| Sarah Kaufman
| Submission (armbar)
| Strikeforce: Rousey vs. Kaufman
| 
| align=center| 1
| align=center| 0:54
| San Diego, California, United States
| 
|-
| Win
| align=center| 5–0
| Miesha Tate
| Technical Submission (armbar)
| Strikeforce: Tate vs. Rousey
| 
| align=center| 1
| align=center| 4:27
| Columbus, Ohio, United States
| 
|-
| Win
| align=center| 4–0
| Julia Budd
| Submission (armbar)
| Strikeforce Challengers: Britt vs. Sayers
| 
| align=center| 1
| align=center| 0:39
| Las Vegas, Nevada, United States
|
|-
| Win
| align=center| 3–0
| Sarah D'Alelio
| Technical Submission (armbar)
| Strikeforce Challengers: Gurgel vs. Duarte
| 
| align=center| 1
| align=center| 0:25
| Las Vegas, Nevada, United States
|
|-
| Win
| align=center| 2–0
| Charmaine Tweet
| Submission (armbar)
| HKFC: School of Hard Knocks 12
| 
| align=center| 1
| align=center| 0:49
| Calgary, Alberta, Canada
| 
|-
| Win
| align=center| 1–0
| Ediane Gomes
| Submission (armbar)
| KOTC: Turning Point
| 
| align=center| 1
| align=center| 0:25
| Tarzana, California, United States
|

|-
| Win
| align=center| 3–0
| Taylor Stratford
| Submission (armbar)
| Tuff-N-Uff - Las Vegas vs. 10th Planet Riverside
| 
| align=center| 1
| align=center| 0:24
| Las Vegas, Nevada, United States
|
|-
| Win
| align=center| 2–0
| Autumn King
| Submission (armbar)
| Tuff-N-Uff - Future Stars of MMA
| 
| align=center| 1
| align=center| 0:57
| Las Vegas, Nevada, United States
|
|-
| Win
| align=center| 1–0
| Hayden Munoz
| Submission (armbar)
| CFL - Ground Zero
| 
| align=center| 1
| align=center| 0:23
| Oxnard, California, United States
|

Pay-per-view bouts

Judo Olympic Games record
{| class="wikitable sortable" style="font-size:100%; text-align:left;"
|-
! Result
! style="text-align:center;"| Rec.
! Opponent
! Score
! Event
! Division
! Date
! Location
|-
|  Win ||align=center| 6–3 ||  Annett Böhm || 0010–0001 ||rowspan=6| 2008 Olympic Games ||rowspan=6 align=center| –70 kg ||rowspan=6|  ||rowspan=6|  Beijing
|-
|  Win ||align=center| 5–3 ||  Anett Meszaros ||  
|-
|  Win ||align=center| 4–3 ||  Rachida Ouerdane || 1001–0000
|-
|  Loss ||align=center| 3–3 ||  Edith Bosch || 0000–1000 
|-
|  Win ||align=center| 3–2 ||  Katarzyna Pilocik || 1000–0000
|-
|  Win ||align=center| 2–2 ||  Nasiba Surkieva || 1010–0000
|-
|  Loss ||align=center| 1–2 ||  Hong Ok-song || 0001–0010 ||rowspan=3|2004 Olympic Games ||rowspan=3 align=center| –63 kg ||rowspan=3|  ||rowspan=3|  Athens
|-
|  Win ||align=center| 1–1 ||  Sarah Clark ||1000–0001
|-
|  Loss ||align=center| 0–1 ||  Claudia Heill || 0000–0010

Bibliography

See also
 List of female mixed martial artists
 List of Strikeforce alumni
 List of Strikeforce champions
 List of UFC champions

References

External links

 
 
 Ronda Rousey at 
 Ronda Rousey at USA Judo
 Ronda Rousey at Judo Vision
 Ronda Rousey  at MMA Quotable
 Ronda Rousey at AwakeningFighters.com
 

|-

1987 births
21st-century American actresses
Actresses from California
American female judoka
American film actresses
American television actresses
American female mixed martial artists
American female professional wrestlers
American sportswomen
Bantamweight mixed martial artists
Featherweight mixed martial artists
Judoka at the 2004 Summer Olympics
Judoka at the 2007 Pan American Games
Judoka at the 2008 Summer Olympics
Living people
Medalists at the 2008 Summer Olympics
Mixed martial artists from California
Mixed martial artists utilizing judo
Mixed martial artists utilizing wrestling
Mixed martial artists utilizing boxing
Olympic bronze medalists for the United States in judo
Olympic judoka of the United States
Pan American Games gold medalists for the United States
Professional wrestlers from California
Sportspeople from Riverside, California
Sportspeople from Santa Monica, California
Strikeforce (mixed martial arts) champions
Ultimate Fighting Championship champions
Pan American Games medalists in judo
Ultimate Fighting Championship female fighters
Medalists at the 2007 Pan American Games
21st-century professional wrestlers
WWE Raw Women's Champions
WWE SmackDown Women's Champions